Glyphidops is a genus of cactus flies in the family Neriidae.

Species

Glyphidops bullatus (Enderlein, 1922)
Glyphidops carrerai Aczél, 1961
Glyphidops coracinus Sepúlveda, Wolff & Carvalho, 2014
Glyphidops durus (Cresson, 1926)
Glyphidops etele Aczél, 1961
Glyphidops filosus (Fabricius, 1805)
Glyphidops flavifrons (Bigot, 1886)
Glyphidops limbatus Enderlein, 1922
Glyphidops obscurus Hennig, 1937
Glyphidops pluricellatus (Schiner, 1868)
Glyphidops rustelatus Sepúlveda, Wolff & Carvalho, 2014
Glyphidops steyskali Sepúlveda, Wolff & Carvalho, 2014
Glyphidops xanthopus (Schiner, 1868)

References

Nerioidea genera
Neriidae
Taxa named by Günther Enderlein
Diptera of South America